Las Cruces Bulletin is a weekly community newspaper published in Las Cruces, New Mexico. The paper is distributed free to homes and businesses in Las Cruces and is available by paid subscription elsewhere.

History
The Las Cruces Bulletin weekly newspaper was founded in 1969 by Ken Dahlstrom. First issue was published on December 4, 1969.  On March 31, 1983, Dahlstrom sold the paper to Steve Klinger who converted the format from broadsheet to tabloid.  The Bulletin was sold by Klinger in 1996 to Kilpatrick Newspapers, Inc. of Austin, Texas.  Owner Mark Kilpatrick sold the newspaper to FIG Publications, LLC, owned by Jaki and David McCollum  on May 1, 2003. On November 1, 2012 it was sold to OPC News, owned by the Osteen family. Osteen Publishing, also owned by the family, publishes The Item.

Features
The paper is published in three sections:
A: News (local news, editorials, letters to the editor, events calendar, sports)
B: Business (local business news, features and legal notices)
C: Arts & Lifestyles (arts features, movie reviews, arts calendar, TV listings), Health and Well-being (health news and features, local hospitals, church and religion, obituaries) and Homes & Southwest Living (home and realty features, homes for sale, gardening, food)

The paper carries the Greater Las Cruces Chamber of Commerce newsletter The Bottom Line as a monthly insert., and the bi-monthly El Prospero newspaper along with the Las Cruces Association of Realtors' 'Neighbor to Neighbor' publication.

Awards
"Community Arts Award" was given to the Las Cruces Bulletin by Dona Ana County Council) in 2010.
In 2009, the Bulletin was named "Small Business of the Year" by the Hispano Chamber of Commerce de Las Cruces.
New Mexico State University  presented their "Spirit of Service Award" to the Bulletin in 2008.
The paper's owner, FIG Publications, received a 2007 VIVA (Vision, Investment, Vitality and Action) Award from the Association of Commerce and Industry of New Mexico. The company was cited for "its work to provide a positive environment for employees and its dedication to local content".
In 2006, the Bulletin was named New Mexico's "Newspaper of the Year" by the New Mexico Farm and Livestock Bureau.
The paper's publisher, David McCollum, was named Citizen of the Year and the paper was named Business of the Year for 2005 by the Greater Las Cruces Chamber of Commerce.

Notes

Newspapers published in New Mexico
Publications established in 1969
Mass media in Las Cruces, New Mexico
Spanish-language newspapers published in the United States
Weekly newspapers published in the United States